Ricardo Buryaile is an Argentine politician. He has served as a member of the Argentine Chamber of Deputies since 2019, and before that from 2013 to 2015, elected in his native Formosa Province. He served as Minister of Agroindustry from 2015 to 2017 in the cabinet of President Mauricio Macri. 

He is of French-Lebanese descent.

References

1962 births
Living people
Argentine people of French descent
Argentine people of Lebanese descent
Ministers of agriculture of Argentina
People from Formosa Province
Members of the Argentine Chamber of Deputies elected in Formosa